Keith Kent (6 November 1912 – 29 September 1999) was  a former Australian rules footballer who played with Collingwood in the Victorian Football League (VFL).

Notes

External links 

Keith Kent's profile at Collingwood Forever

1912 births
1999 deaths
Australian rules footballers from Victoria (Australia)
Collingwood Football Club players